Ullareds IK is a Swedish football club located in Ullared.

Background
Ullareds IK currently plays in Division 2 VÄSTRA GÖTALAND which is the fourth tier of Swedish football. They play their home matches at the Hedevi in Ullared.

The club is affiliated to Hallands Fotbollförbund.

Season to season

Footnotes

External links
 Ullareds IK – Official website

Football clubs in Halland County
1929 establishments in Sweden